Duncan McFarlane (1841 – 20 April 1918) was a Scottish-born New Zealand politician. He was a losing candidate in the 1908 Invercargill mayoral election. He served three terms as councillor (1888–1992, 1898–1900, 1906–1913). He was mayor of Invercargill twice (1913–1917). His son Duncan McFarlane Jr was mayor of Gore.

References

Sources

External links
Brief History of Eastern Cemetery – past mayors

1841 births
1918 deaths
People from Linlithgow
Scottish emigrants to New Zealand
Invercargill City Councillors
Mayors of Invercargill
Burials at Eastern Cemetery, Invercargill